Falls the Shadow may refer to:

Falls the Shadow (novel)
Falls the Shadow (Sharon Kay Penman)

The phrase is usually a reference to T. S. Eliot's poem, The Hollow Men: